Angeliki Makri (born 25 September 1978) is a Greek racewalker. In 2019, she competed in the women's 50 kilometres walk at the 2019 World Athletics Championships held in Doha, Qatar. She finished in 14th place.

References

External links 
 

Living people
1978 births
Place of birth missing (living people)
Greek female racewalkers
World Athletics Championships athletes for Greece